Tek Chand is an Indian paralympic shot putter and javelin thrower.

Tek Chand may also refer to:

 Tek Chand Sharma (Delhi politician), Indian politician
 Tek Chand Sharma, Indian politician